The western nectar bat (Lonchophylla hesperia) is a species of bat in the family Phyllostomidae. It is found in Ecuador and Peru.

References

Lonchophylla
Bats of South America
Mammals of Ecuador
Mammals of Peru
Mammals described in 1908
Taxa named by Glover Morrill Allen
Taxonomy articles created by Polbot